Phanerochaete tuberculata is a plant pathogen infecting plane trees.

References

Fungal tree pathogens and diseases
tuberculata
Taxa named by Petter Adolf Karsten
Fungi described in 1896